Yuhu District is one of two urban districts in Xiangtan City, Hunan Province, China. Located in the western region of the city proper and on the northwestern shoreside of the Xiang River, the district is bordered to the north by Yuelu District of Changsha City, to the east by Tianxin District of Changsha City and Yuetang District, to the south by Xiangtan County, to the west by Ningxiang County.

Administrative divisions
As of 2020, Yuhu District administers 8 subdistricts, 3 towns, and 1 township.

Subdistricts 

Towns 

Township 

Tourist attractions 
Wan Pavilion is a well known tourist spot in the district, which provides the best view of Xiang River in Xiangtan.

References

www.xzqh.org 

 
Districts of Xiangtan